The Bulgaria–Romania border is the state border between Bulgaria and Romania.

For most of its length, the border follows the course of the lower Danube, up until the town of Silistra. From Silistra, the river continues north into the Romanian territory. East of that point, the land border passes through the historical region of Dobruja, dividing it into Northern Dobruja in Romania and Southern Dobruja in Bulgaria.

The Bulgaria–Romania border is an internal border of the European Union. However, as of  neither country is part of the Schengen Area. As a result, border controls are conducted between the two countries, albeit often jointly (once per crossing).

Border crossings
 Vidin–Calafat (New Europe Bridge): road, railway
 Oryahovo-Bechet: ferry
 Nikopol-Turnu Măgurele: ferry
 Svishtov-Zimnicea: ferry
 Ruse–Giurgiu (Danube Bridge): road, railway
 Silistra–Ostrov: road
 Kaynardzha–Lipnița: road
 Krushari–Dobromir: road
 Kardam–Negru Vodă: road, railway
 Durankulak–Vama Veche: road

Maps

See also
Bulgaria–Romania relations
Union of Bulgaria and Romania

References

 
European Union internal borders
Borders of Romania
Borders of Bulgaria
International borders